Johnny Harvey was an early-twentieth-century Scottish-American association football forward.

Records of Harvey’s career are fragmentary, but he played for J&P Coats during the 1915–1916 Southern New England Soccer League season. In 1923, he was back with J&P Coats as it played in the American Soccer League. In 1927, he began the season with Coats, played eleven games, then moved to the Fall River Marksmen for the remainder of the season. He returned to J&P Coats which was renamed the Pawtucket Rangers under new ownership. In 1931, he jumped through three teams, the New Bedford Whalers, Marksmen and Rangers.

External links
 

American soccer players
American Soccer League (1921–1933) players
Fall River Marksmen players
J&P Coats players
New Bedford Whalers players
Pawtucket Rangers players
Association football forwards
Year of birth missing